Julian "Jute" Bell (May 30, 1900 – December 7, 1991) was an American baseball pitcher in the Negro leagues. He played professionally from 1923 to 1931 with several teams.

References

External links
 and Seamheads 

1900 births
1991 deaths
Detroit Stars players
Louisville White Sox players
Birmingham Black Barons players
Baseball players from Tennessee
People from Jellico, Tennessee
Baseball pitchers
20th-century African-American sportspeople